Machi Goth railway station (Urdu and ) is located in Machi Goth village, Rahim Yar Khan District of Punjab province, Pakistan.

See also
 List of railway stations in Pakistan
 Pakistan Railways

References

External links

Railway stations in Rahim Yar Khan District
Railway stations on Karachi–Peshawar Line (ML 1)